Cecil is a town in Cook County, Georgia, United States. The population was 286 at the 2010 census.

History
A post office called Cecil was established in 1888. The Georgia General Assembly incorporated Cecil as a town in 1890.

Geography

Cecil is located at  (31.047092, -83.393416).

Demographics

2020 census

As of the 2020 United States census, there were 284 people, 128 households, and 82 families residing in the city.

2000 census
As of the census of 2000, there were 265 people, 118 households, and 77 families residing in the town. The racial makeup of the town was 49.43% White, 48.68% African American, 0.75% Native American, 1.13% from other races. Hispanic or Latino of any race were 3.77% of the population.

There were 118 households, out of which 31.4% had children under the age of 18 living with them, 45.8% were married couples living together, 12.7% had a female householder with no husband present, and 34.7% were non-families. 32.2% of all households were made up of individuals, and 17.8% had someone living alone who was 65 years of age or older.  The average household size was 2.25 and the average family size was 2.82.

In the town, the population was spread out, with 28.3% under the age of 18, 3.0% from 18 to 24, 28.3% from 25 to 44, 20.8% from 45 to 64, and 19.5% who were 65 years of age or older.  The median age was 38 years. For every 100 females, there were 87.9 males.  For every 100 females age 18 and over, there were 91.9 males.

The median income for a household in the town was $20,469, and the median income for a family was $24,500. Males had a median income of $36,250 versus $17,143 for females. The per capita income for the town was $12,490.  About 15.8% of families and 21.1% of the population were below the poverty line, including 31.6% of those under the age of eighteen and 27.4% of those 65 or over.

Arts and culture
South Georgia Motorsports Park, a racing venue, is located near Cecil.

The town offers rustic accommodations at the Cecil Bay RV Park.

References

Towns in Cook County, Georgia
Towns in Georgia (U.S. state)